This is a list of heads of the Herzegovina-Neretva Canton.

Heads of the Herzegovina-Neretva Canton (1996–present)

Governors

Prime Ministers

External links
World Statesmen - Herzegovina-Neretva Canton

Herzegovina-Neretva Canton